The Battle of al-Qaryatayn (2015) was a military operation launched by the Islamic State of Iraq and the Levant to capture the town of al-Qaryatayn, in August 2015, during the Syrian Civil War.

Background 
For much of the Syrian Civil War, which began in March 2011, al-Qaryatayn remained relatively neutral in the conflict. Town elders made agreements with both government forces and the rebels to stay out of the fighting. However, its location is strategic as it lies at a crossroads between the northern and southern parts of the country. Al-Qaryatayn has served as conduit for both sides. Rebels smuggle arms from the north to rebel fighters in Damascus, while the government uses the town to reinforce and resupply their forces in the north and west. It has also been used as a corridor for defectors from the Syrian Army from across the country as highways from the northern, southern, eastern and western directions run through al-Qaryatayn.
In late May 2015, ISIL forces captured Palmyra and the surrounding countryside after a large offensive.

ISIL takeover 
On 5 August, ISIL captured the town of al-Qaryatayn. This resulted in the deaths of 40 Syrian soldiers and 27 ISIL militants. It was reported that ISIL use deserts of Homs as launchpad for the attack on Al Qaraytain and the master mind of this operation was an ISIL Emir known as Abu Hassan Al Khatami. Abu Hassan was killed in the battle and ISIL renamed the battle after him as Battle of Abu Hassan Al Khatami in order to pay tribute to his services to ISIL.

Aftermath 
On 6 August, The Islamic State group abducted 230 civilians, including at least 60 Christians from Al-Qaryatayn. ISIL later advanced even further, capturing Mahin and Huwwarin by 8 August, thus pushing hundreds of Christians to flee persecution. However, the Syrian military recaptured Mahin later after intense airstrikes and ground force attack that killed 20 IS fighters.

On 9 August, the SAAF bombed ISIL positions in al-Qaryatayn, resulting in the deaths of around 30 ISIL fighters as well as the destruction of seven vehicles and a rocket depot, according to governmental sources. On 13 August, SOHR reported fierce fighting between the SAA and ISIL fighters in the area between al-Qaryatayn and Mahin and Huwwarin, when ISIL attempted to advance towards the two towns. ISIL briefly managed to capture both Mheen and Hawwarin west of Al-Qaryateyn city on 31 October in an attempted general offence on Sadad, before losing this territory 22–23 November.

The SAA later recaptured al-Qaryatayn in the Battle of al-Qaryatayn (2016).

References 

August 2015 events in Syria
al-Qaryatayn
Homs Governorate in the Syrian civil war
Al-Qaryatayn (2015)
Al-Qaryatayn (2015)
al-Qaryatayn